Robinet  may refer to :

People
 Jean-Baptiste Robinet (1735–1820), French naturalist
 Stéphane Robinet (born 1983), French footballer
 Thomas Robinet (born 1996), French footballer
 Alexandre Robinet de La Serve (1821–1882), French journalist and politician, deputy and then senator of Réunion from 1870 to 1882
 Nicole Robinet de La Serve (1791–1842), French journalist, lawyer and politician
 Cora Millet-Robinet (1798–1890), French agricultural innovator and silk producer
 Robinet Testard (fl. 1470–1531), French medieval illuminator and painter
 Marcel Perez (1884–1929), Spanish comedian, stage name Robinet
 Robinet (composer) (fl 1482–1507), French composer

Other
 Common chaffinch, a small bird of the finch family
 European robin, usually referred to simply as a "robin"
 Robinet (grape), another name for the French wine grape Jacquère

See also
 Robinett (disambiguation)
 Robinette (disambiguation)